George V. Skrotskii (January 11, 1915 – July 13, 1992) was a Russian physicist.

Skrotskii realized that electromagnetic field equations in a curved spacetime can be written in a non-covariant form formally equivalent to Maxwell's equations in a macroscopic medium in flat spacetime.

References
 A.A. Kolokolov/G.V. Skrotskii."Interference of reactive components of an electromagnetic field". Soviet Physics - Uspekhi, Vol. 35, No. 12 (1992), pp. 1089–1093.
 G.V. Pokazaniev/G.V. Skrotskii. " The Basics of Torsion Mechanics. Psevdomagnetizm. //Uspekhi fizicheskikh nauk, 1979, v. 129, # 4, p. 615. (Russian)
 The gravitational effect is known as gravitational Faraday rotation or the Rytov or Skrotskii effect. Lett. 23 (1983) 235–237. [399] GV Skrotskii, The influence of gravitation on the propagation of light, Sov. Phys. Doklady 2

External links
Nader Haghighipour
Biography of G. V. Skrotskii 

1915 births
1992 deaths
Russian physicists